A state bank is generally a financial institution that is chartered by a federated state, as opposed to one regulated at the federal or national level. State banks differ from a reserve bank in that it does not necessarily control monetary policy (the state in question may have no legal capacity to create monetary policy), but instead usually offers only retail and commercial services.

United States
In the United States, the terms "state-chartered bank" or "state-chartered savings bank" are used in contradistinction to "national bank" or "federal savings bank", which are technically chartered across all US states. A national bank must have "National" or "N.A." in its corporate name, a Federal Savings Bank must have "Federal" or "F.S.B." in its name, while a state chartered bank cannot have "National" or "Federal" in its name.  All national banks and savings institutions are chartered and regulated by the Office of the Comptroller of the Currency.  State banks are chartered and regulated by a state agency (often called the Department of Financial Institutions) in the state in which its headquarters are located.  In addition, state banks that are members of the Federal Reserve are regulated by the Federal Reserve; state banks that are not members of the Federal Reserve are regulated by the Federal Deposit Insurance Corporation (FDIC).  Therefore, virtually every state chartered bank has both a state and federal regulator. There are a very small number of state banks that do not have FDIC insurance.

Australia
Each Australian state formerly had a state bank, but all have since been privatised. Although the Commonwealth Bank was to some extent a state bank (although owned by the Federal or national Government and undertaking central bank functions until the split of these functions into the Reserve Bank of Australia in 1959) by the above definition before privatisation, the word ‘state’ in Australia refers predominantly to the subnational entities.

 
 Government Savings Bank of New South Wales: established 1871, collapsed 1931 and taken over by Commonwealth Bank.
 State Bank of New South Wales: established 1933, privatised and sold to Colonial Mutual in 1994
 
 Queensland Government Savings Bank: established 1865, taken over by Commonwealth Bank of Australia in 1920.
 
 Savings Bank of South Australia: established 1848 as a private institution, nationalised in 1945, merged into the State Bank of South Australia in 1984.
 State Bank of South Australia: established 1896, collapsed in 1991, subsequently privatised and rebranded as BankSA.
 
 State Savings Bank of Tasmania: established 1902, taken over by Commonwealth Bank in 1913.
 
 State Bank of Victoria: established 1842, collapsed in 1991 and sold to the Commonwealth Bank.
 
 Bank of Western Australia: established 1895, privatised and sold to Bank of Scotland in 1995, now owned by Commonwealth Bank trading as Bankwest
 State Savings Bank of Western Australia: established 1863, taken over by Commonwealth Bank in 1931.

Other entities
 State Bank of India (founded as a private commercial bank, then nationalised by the Government of India)
 State Bank of Pakistan
 State Bank of Vietnam

Banking
Monetary reform